Timothy Hays David (born 16 March 1996) is a Singapore born Australian cricketer. He played for the Singapore national cricket team between 2019 and 2020, before switching allegiance to Australia in 2022. He was part of the Australian team's squad for the 2022 T20 World Cup. He has played various Twenty20 franchise teams. He made his international debut for Singapore in July 2019 and played 14 T20Is making is debut for Australia in 2022 against India.

Early life
Timothy Hays David was born in Singapore to Rod David, a cricketer who played for Singapore at the 1997 ICC Trophy. The family moved to Singapore from Australia in the 1990s where his father worked as an engineer. They moved back to Australia when he was two years old in the wake of the 1997 Asian financial crisis and he grew up in Perth.

Franchise and overseas career

Big Bash League
David made his Twenty20 debut for Perth Scorchers in the 2017–18 Big Bash League season (BBL) on 1 January 2018. For the 2020–21 Big Bash League season, David was signed by the Hobart Hurricanes. In the opening fixture of the tournament, he scored 58 runs, with Hobart beating the Sydney Sixers by 16 runs, and David being named the player of the match. In February 2022, David signed a two-year extension to his BBL contract with the Hobart Hurricanes.

Pakistan Super League
In May 2021, in the PSL Mini Replacement Draft for the remainder of the postponed 2021 Pakistan Super League, David was signed by the Lahore Qalandars as a replacement for Joe Burns. In the 2022 Pakistan Super league David was signed by reigning champions Multan Sultans.

England
In July 2021, David played in the Hoofdklasse tournament in the Netherlands. After playing in the Dutch league, David signed with Surrey County Cricket Club to play in Surrey's final two matches in the 2021 T20 Blast in England. The following month, he played in the 2021 Royal London One-Day Cup, and scored his first century in List A cricket with an unbeaten 140 against Warwickshire. In the quarter-finals of the tournament, David scored 102 runs, as Surrey beat Gloucestershire by five wickets to advance to the semi-finals of the competition.

In 2021, he was drafted by Southern Brave for the inaugural season of The Hundred. In the final for the 2021 season of The Hundred, David scored 15 off 6 balls, and then came up with a catch, and later a crucial runout of Liam Livingstone, that each played a significant role in his team winning. In February 2022, David was signed by Lancashire County Cricket Club to play in the 2022 T20 Blast in England. In April 2022, he was bought by the Southern Brave for the 2022 season of The Hundred.

Indian Premier League
In August 2021, David was included in the Royal Challengers Bangalore squad for the second phase of the 2021 Indian Premier League (IPL) in the UAE. He made his IPL debut on 24 September 2021 against Chennai Super Kings. By doing so, he became the first international player from Singapore to play in the IPL. In February 2022, he was bought by the Mumbai Indians in 2022 Indian Premier League auction.

Teams Played
Western Australia XI, Perth Scorchers, Singapore, Hobart Hurricanes, Lahore Qalandars, Surrey, Saint Lucia Kings, Southern Brave, Royal Challengers Bangalore, Tasmania, Multan Sultans, Mumbai Indians, Lancashire, Australia.

International career
In July 2019, David was added to a training squad for the Singapore cricket team ahead of the Regional Finals of the 2018–19 ICC T20 World Cup Asia Qualifier tournament. Later the same month, he was named in Singapore's Twenty20 International (T20I) squad for the Regional Finals of the tournament. He made his T20I debut for Singapore against Qatar on 22 July 2019.

In September 2019, David was named in Singapore's squad for the 2019 Malaysia Cricket World Cup Challenge League A tournament. He made his List A debut for Singapore, against Qatar, in the Cricket World Cup Challenge League A tournament on 17 September 2019. He was the leading run-scorer in the tournament, with 369 runs in five matches. In October 2019, he was named in Singapore's squad for the 2019 ICC T20 World Cup Qualifier tournament in the United Arab Emirates. Ahead of the tournament, the International Cricket Council (ICC) named him as the player to watch in Singapore's squad.

In 2022, David was named in the Australian national cricket team's squad for the 2022 World Cup and their series against India. Under the International Cricket Council's rules, he was deemed eligible to play for Australia despite having previously played for Singapore. He made his T20I debut for Australia against India on 20 September 2022. In his third match for Australia, he hit 54 off 27 balls in Hyderabad against India.

References

External links
 
 
 Hobart Hurricanes player profile

1996 births
Living people
Singaporean people of Australian descent
Australian people of Singaporean descent
Singaporean emigrants to Australia
People educated at Scotch College, Perth
Australian cricketers
Australia Twenty20 International cricketers
Singaporean cricketers
Singapore Twenty20 International cricketers
Dual international cricketers
Hobart Hurricanes cricketers
Lahore Qalandars cricketers
Lancashire cricketers
MI Cape Town cricketers
Multan Sultans cricketers
Mumbai Indians cricketers
Perth Scorchers cricketers
Royal Challengers Bangalore cricketers
Southern Brave cricketers
Saint Lucia Kings cricketers
Surrey cricketers